Mukerian Assembly constituency (Sl. No.: 39) is a Punjab Legislative Assembly constituency in Hoshiarpur district, Punjab state, India.
Illegal mining, drugs and 3 farm laws were the major issues in the constituency in 2022 elections.

Members of the Legislative Assembly

Election results

2022

2019 bypoll 
A by-poll was needed due to the death of sitting MLA Rajnish Kumar Babbi.

2017

See also
 List of constituencies of the Punjab Legislative Assembly
 Hoshiarpur district

References

External links
  

Assembly constituencies of Punjab, India
Hoshiarpur district